Gunnar Gundersen (born 21 May 1956 in Åsnes) is a Norwegian politician for the Conservative Party.

He was elected to the Norwegian Parliament from Hedmark in 2005.

On the local level he was a deputy member of Åsnes municipal council from 1999 to 2007. He chaired the county party chapter from 2004 to 2005, and was a member of the Conservative Party central board in the same period.

He studied at the University of Wisconsin, Madison 1975-1979 and the University of California, Berkeley 1981–1982. He worked as a research assistant at the Norwegian College of Agriculture from 1982 to 1985, and then as a local businessman.

Gundersen is also a former Olympic swimmer. He competed in the men's 400 metre individual medley at the 1976 Summer Olympics. His son Tore Andreas Gundersen is a professional football player.

References

External links

1956 births
Living people
People from Åsnes
Conservative Party (Norway) politicians
Members of the Storting
Hedmark politicians
Norwegian male medley swimmers
Swimmers at the 1976 Summer Olympics
Olympic swimmers of Norway
Academic staff of the Norwegian College of Agriculture
University of Wisconsin–Madison alumni
Norwegian sportsperson-politicians
21st-century Norwegian politicians